Wang Lina (born 5 February 1978 in Heilongjiang) is the Former China women's national volleyball team Outside Hitter. She won the 2003 World Cup and 2004 Olympics gold medal.

Clubs
  Bayi (Army)(1995-2008)
  Guangzhou Jianlong (2009–2010)
  Guangdong Evergrande (2011–)

References

External links
 FIVB Profile

1978 births
Living people
Chinese women's volleyball players
Olympic volleyball players of China
Volleyball players at the 1996 Summer Olympics
Volleyball players at the 2000 Summer Olympics
Volleyball players at the 2004 Summer Olympics
Olympic gold medalists for China
Olympic silver medalists for China
Olympic medalists in volleyball
People from Yichun, Heilongjiang
Medalists at the 2004 Summer Olympics
Asian Games medalists in volleyball
Volleyball players at the 1998 Asian Games
Medalists at the 1996 Summer Olympics
Asian Games gold medalists for China
Volleyball players from Heilongjiang
Medalists at the 1998 Asian Games
Outside hitters